Tova Hamilton is a Jamaican attorney-at-Law and politician from the Labour Party. She was elected in 2020 as the MP for Trelawny Northern.

References 

Living people
21st-century Jamaican women politicians
21st-century Jamaican politicians
Jamaica Labour Party politicians
Members of the House of Representatives of Jamaica
People from Trelawny Parish
University of the West Indies alumni
Jamaican women lawyers
Year of birth missing (living people)
21st-century Jamaican lawyers
Members of the 14th Parliament of Jamaica